Lucky Numbers is a 2000 black comedy film directed by Nora Ephron. The screenplay by Adam Resnick was inspired by the 1980 Pennsylvania Lottery scandal. It is the only film Ephron directed without also writing the screenplay. It is considered to be one of the biggest bombs of all time.

Plot
Russ Richards, the weatherman for a Harrisburg, Pennsylvania, television station, is revered as a local celebrity by his viewers, and fame affords him such perks as a reserved parking spot and his own booth at Denny's, where an omelet bears his name. His eternally optimistic demeanor conceals the fact his snowmobile dealership is on the verge of bankruptcy due to an unusually warm winter.

His friend Gig, a shady strip club owner, suggests an insurance scam will free Russ of his financial problems, but when the scheme fails to pay off, Russ finds himself even deeper in debt and the target of a hitman named Dale. Gig then proposes Russ rig the Pennsylvania Lottery with the help of his amoral girlfriend Crystal Latroy, a ditzy model who pulls and announces the winning numbers on television, and her oddball cousin Walter, who will pose as the owner of the lucky ticket.

Their plan works, but before the $6.4 million jackpot can be claimed, everything begins to unravel. First, Walter gets greedy, refuses to hand the winning ticket over to his cousin and Crystal's physical confrontation triggers Walter's ultimately fatal asthma attack.  Sleazy station manager Dick Simmons, who also is sleeping with Crystal, tries to blackmail her and Russ when he discovers what they have done, and others who have uncovered what appears to be the worst kept secret in town demand their share as well.

Mayhem and murder ensue, prompting lazy detectives Lakewood and Chambers to initiate an investigation they hope will not be too taxing. Russ decides to sell the ticket to Dick for $100,000 to get clear of the debt he owes to Dale. Crystal is irate, and she immediately seduces Dick to get back into her share of the winnings. Dale breaks into Dick's house and tries to rob the ticket from him, but the police arrive, and Lakewood ends up killing him.

On his way home, Lakewood comes across Russ who has jackknifed and overturned an 18-wheeler as he tries to unload his snowmobile inventory on another dealer. Fearing Lakewood has come to arrest him, Russ flees with his $100,000 on a snowmobile but crashes into a tree. At the hospital, Lakewood gives him a ticket for operating the snowmobile without a license and explains what happened to Dick and Dale. Russ goes to Dick's hospital room and steals the lottery ticket back. He gives it to Wendy (the waitress from Denny's) and moves to Florida where he becomes a successful host of a gameshow called "Lucky Numbers".

Cast
 John Travolta as Russ Richards
 Lisa Kudrow as Crystal Latroy
 Tim Roth as Gig
 Ed O'Neill as Dick Simmons
 Michael Rapaport as Dale
 Michael Moore as Walter
 Bill Pullman as Detective Pat Lakewood
 Daryl Mitchell as Detective Chambers
 Richard Schiff as Jerry Green
 Caroline Aaron as Nurse Sharpling
 Sam McMurray as Chief Troutman
 Michael Weston as Larry
 Maria Bamford as Wendy Fawcett
 John F. O'Donohue  as Bobby
 Colin Mochrie  as Jack
 Nick Loren as Father
 Jake Fritz as Sam
 Emmy Laybourne as Process saver
 Ken Jenkins as Dan Schuff

Soundtrack

Track listing
 "Light of Day" - Joan Jett and the Blackhearts
 "Obsession" - Animotion
 "Right Place, Wrong Time" - Dr. John
 "Easy Money" - Rickie Lee Jones
 "Heaven's on Fire" - Kiss
 "Rapture" - Blondie
 "Freeze-Frame" - The J. Geils Band
 "Love is the Drug" - Grace Jones
 "We Are the Champions" - Queen
 "My Way" - Jimmy Roselli
 "My Big Reward" - Joan Jett and the Blackhearts
 "Lucky Numbers" - George Fenton
 "Brave Strangers" - Bob Seger & The Silver Bullet Band
 "Moving In Stereo" - The Cars

Release

Box office
The film, based on a $63 million budget, only grossed $10,890,222.

Critical reception
Lucky Numbers earned negative reviews from critics. On Rotten Tomatoes it has a rating of 22% based on 97 reviews. The site's consensus states: "Nora Ephron's attempt at dark comedy is an uneven product, both in terms of the direction and the acting. The characters are unlikable to the point where you don't care what happens to them, and Ephron condescends to the material." On Metacritic it has a score of 31 out of 100 based on reviews from 30 critics, indicating "generally unfavorable reviews". Audiences surveyed by CinemaScore gave the film a grade F.

Roger Ebert of the Chicago Sun-Times noted the film "tells too much story at not enough energy. It should have been cut back and cranked up. Instead, it keeps introducing new characters until the plot becomes a juggling act just when it should be a sprint. And there's another problem: Is it intended as a comedy, or not? I ask because there are funny things in it, and then gruesome things, sad things and brutal things. Quentin Tarantino was able to cover that spread in Pulp Fiction. But Nora Ephron . . . doesn't find a way . . . So much depends on tone in a movie. Either you find the right one and stick with it, or you're in trouble (unless, like Tarantino, you really know what you're doing). If we're supposed to like these people, then there's a point beyond which they should not go in their villainy. If we're not, then the scenes where they're nice should have more irony . . . By the end of the film, we're less entertained than relieved. Lots of stuff happened, and much of it might have been interesting in a different kind of film. Here we got the curious sense that the characters are racing around Harrisburg breathlessly trying to keep up with the plot."

Mick LaSalle of the San Francisco Chronicle observed, "As both a writer and a director, Ephron has specialized in sentiment mixed with wiseguy banter - a combination that sometimes works but just as often succeeds only in being both cloying and irritating. In Lucky Numbers . . . [Ephron] is suddenly liberated, and she guides her talented cast toward performances that are playful and yet comically precise . . . It's a bit of fluff that, all the same, is a gentle commentary on human nature . . . Mainly it's just a showcase for a lot of gifted comic actors to show their stuff - and for Travolta to go from complacency to wide-eyed panic, hitting all points in between."

Michael O'Sullivan of The Washington Post said, "Although Travolta gets top billing, Kudrow is the film's true manic engine, and her ability to carry off perky amorality propels the preposterous plot forward through numerous twists and setbacks . . . Her co-star, looking bloated and inert, appears to have settled into the role of the fall guy rather than even attempt to be an active participant. Ephron doesn't look as if she has her heart in the job either. Yes, the film is dark (literally as well as figuratively, since certain scenes are almost murky), but the director doesn't seem to want to acknowledge that the material is as cantankerous as it is. Time and time again, she keeps pulling back from the abyss just when Resnick's story lets us know that it's ready to abandon all social decency and hurl itself over the edge."

Lisa Schwarzbaum of Entertainment Weekly graded the film with a "D" and commented, "The laughs are few in this inert, ungenerous comedy because Ephron's tendency to condescend to her characters, coupled with Harrisburg-born Resnick's mocking worldview . . . makes for a queasy time." She added everyone in the cast is "ill-served by the director's rhythmless pacing, her muddy visual sense, and her insistence on reducing characters to caricatures."

Accolades

John Travolta's performances in this and Battlefield Earth won him the Golden Raspberry Award for Worst Actor.

DVD release

The film was released on VHS and DVD on March 20, 2001.

References

External links

2000 films
2000 black comedy films
2000s crime comedy films
American black comedy films
American crime comedy films
2000s English-language films
Films scored by George Fenton
American films based on actual events
Films directed by Nora Ephron
Films set in 1988
Films set in Pennsylvania
French black comedy films
French crime comedy films
English-language French films
Golden Raspberry Award winning films
Paramount Pictures films
StudioCanal films
Lottery fraud in fiction
2000 comedy films
Films with screenplays by Adam Resnick
2000s American films
Films about lotteries
2000s French films